Wang Ji (1378–1460), courtesy name Shangde (尚德), was a Chinese politician of the Ming dynasty.

See also 
 Luchuan–Pingmian campaigns

1378 births
1460 deaths
Ming dynasty politicians